Meghimatium bilineatum is a species of gastropod belonging to the family Philomycidae.

The species is found in Southeastern Asia.

References

Philomycidae